This is a list of Italian television related events from 1981.

Debuts

RAI

Variety 

 Blitz – 3 seasons. Interstitial program of the Sunday afternoon, hosted by Gianni Minà and focused on sport and entertainment. In 1984, the show is at the center of a scandal, because of a blasphemy said live by the actor Leopoldo Mastelloni in an interview.
Mister Fantasy – Musica da vedere (Music to see), variety hosted by Carlo Massarini and Mario Luzzato Fegis, that reveals the music videos (often realized on purpose for the show) to the Italian public; four seasons.

Private channels

Show for children 
Bim Bum Bam (Antenna Nord, later Italia Uno and Canale 5) – lasted till 2002, hosted for all the 1980s by Paolo Bonolis, sided by the puppet Uan. The program, started in the Rusconi's Antenna Nord as a simple container of animated films, becomes, after the passage to Fininvest, the most popular show for children of the time. The show includes, besides the cartoons (of which The Smurfs is the most successful), comical sketches and parody fiction.

Television shows

Drama 

 I giochi del diavolo (The devil’s games) – cycle of TV-movies, based on six fantastic tales of the Nineteenth Century, chosen by Italo Calvino; the most significant is La Vénus d'Ille, by Mario and Lamberto Bava, from Prosper Merimée’s tale.
La giacca verde (The green jacket) – by Franco Giraldi, with Jean-Pierre Cassel, Renzo Montagnani and Senta Berger; from a Mario Soldati’s story. In the second world war, a famous conductor and a modest timpanist  exchange their social roles and almost their identities.
Il padre (The father) – by Giorgio Pressburger, from the Strindberg’s play, with Giorgio Albertazzi.

Miniseries 
Don Luigi Sturzo - by Giovanni Fago, biopic with Flavio Bucci in the title role; 3 episodes.
Vita di Antonio Gramsci (Life of Antonio Gramsci) – by Raffaele Maiello, script by Suso Cecchi D’Amico and Giuseppe Fiori, with Mattia Sbragia in the title role; 4 episodes.
George Sand – by Giorgio Albertazzi (also actor as Michel de Bourges), with Anna Proclemer in the title role; 4 episodes.

Variety 
Tutto compreso (All inclusive) – by Giancarlo Nicotra, with Ezio Greggio and Enrico Beruschi; variety set in a resort, considered a forerunner of the Drive In’s formula.
Stasera niente di nuovo (Nothing new tonight) – by Romolo Siena; last show in RAI of Raimondo Vianello and Sandra Mondaini, sided by the young soubrette Heather Parisi.
Telepatria international ovvero niente paura siamo italiani (Telepatria international, or No fear, we are Italians) variety with Renzo Arbore and Luciano De Crescenzo, dealing ironically with the Italian patriotism theme: 3 episodes.

References 

1981 in Italian television